Emin Fuat Keyman (born 1958) is a Turkish academic and political scientist.

Fuat Keyman is Director of Istanbul Policy Center and Professor of International Relations at Sabancı University.

References

External links
 Homepage of Fuat Keyman at IPC
 Fuat Keyman's opinions on the Turkish presidential election 
 Homepage of GLODEM

Academic staff of Sabancı University
Turkish political scientists
Living people
1958 births